Duke of Cumberland and Strathearn was a title in the Peerage of Great Britain that was conferred upon a member of the British royal family. It was named after the county of Cumberland in England, and after Strathearn in Scotland.

History
The title of Duke of Cumberland had been created three times in the Peerages of England and Great Britain.

The title of Duke of Cumberland and Strathearn was created on 22 October 1766 in the Peerage of Great Britain. This double dukedom and the Earldom of Dublin in the Peerage of Ireland were bestowed on Prince Henry, the third son of Frederick, Prince of Wales, and grandson of King George II. Since Prince Henry died without legitimate children, the title became extinct.

The title of Duke of Cumberland and Teviotdale was later created in the Peerage of Great Britain.

List of titleholders

Duke of Cumberland and Strathearn (1766)

|Prince Henry, Duke of Cumberland and Strathearn  also Earl of Dublin (Ireland, 1766)
|
|7 November 1745Leicester House, London son of Frederick, Prince of Wales, and Princess Augusta of Saxe-Gotha
|Anne Horton
|18 September 1790 London  aged 44
|}

Extinct dukedoms in the Peerage of Great Britain
1766 establishments in Great Britain
Noble titles created in 1766